is a railway station in the city of Sano, Tochigi, Japan, operated by the private railway operator Tōbu Railway. The station is numbered "TI-38".

Lines

Station layout
Tada Station has two opposed side platforms, connected to the station building by a footbridge. A third track for freight trains originally lay between the current tracks.

Platforms

Adjacent stations

History

Tada Station opened on 20 March 1894. From 1 September 1973, the station became unmanned. The original station building was replaced by a modern prefabricated structure in October 2007.

From 17 March 2012, station numbering was introduced on all Tōbu lines, with Tada Station becoming "TI-38".

Passenger statistics
In fiscal 2019, the station was used by an average of 151 passengers daily (boarding passengers only).

Surrounding area
 
 Tanuma Industrial Park

See also
 List of railway stations in Japan

References

External links

 Tobu station information 
	

Tobu Sano Line
Stations of Tobu Railway
Railway stations in Tochigi Prefecture
Railway stations in Japan opened in 1894
Sano, Tochigi